The 1975 Air Force Falcons football team represented the United States Air Force Academy as an independent during the 1975 NCAA Division I football season. Led by 18th-year head coach Ben Martin, the Falcons compiled a record of 2–8–1 and were outscored by their opponents 265–156. Air Force played their home games at Falcon Stadium in Colorado Springs, Colorado.

Schedule

Roster

References

Air Force
Air Force Falcons football seasons
Air Force Falcons football